Bucculatrix gnaphaliella is a moth of the family Bucculatricidae. It is found from Sweden and the Baltic region to the Pyrenees, Italy and Romania and from France to Russia. It was described by Georg Friedrich Treitschke in 1833.

The wingspan is 8–9 mm.

The larvae feed on Gnaphalium and Helichrysum arenarium. They mine the leaves of their host plant. In autumn, larvae create a thin corridor with a central frass line. In spring, they continue this mine with a much wider corridor. The larva then leaves the mine, and starts making fleck mines on the leaf underside. In the end, it bores the shoots of the host plant. Larvae of the first generation can be found from autumn to May of the following year. Second generation larvae are found in July and live freely. They are pale yellow.

References

External links
 Images representing Bucculatrix gnaphaliella at Consortium for the Barcode of Life

Moths described in 1833
Bucculatricidae
Moths of Europe
Taxa named by Georg Friedrich Treitschke
Leaf miners